Indirect presidential elections were held in Nauru on 28 August 2007. They were originally scheduled for June, but a debate on changing the constitution and allowing direct presidential elections delayed the election for a few months.

The incumbent Ludwig Scotty was re-elected with fourteen of the eighteen votes in parliament. The candidate of the opposition, Commonwealth Games gold-winning weightlifter Marcus Stephen, earned three votes.

However, after a vote of no confidence in December, 2007, the Administration of President of Nauru Ludwig Scotty was overturned in favour of a new Administration led by Marcus Stephen, who became President of Nauru in place of Mr. Scotty.

References

2007
2007 elections in Oceania
Presidential election